The men's shot put event at the 1971 Pan American Games was held in Cali on 2 August.

Results

References

Athletics at the 1971 Pan American Games
1971